Daghalian or Daghlian or Daghliyan may refer to:
 Daghalian-e Bala
 Daghalian-e Pain
 Harry Daghlian